Richard Waugh (born February 28, 1961) is a Canadian actor and voice actor, is best known for providing the voice of Albert Wesker in the video games Resident Evil – Code: Veronica, Resident Evil Zero, and Resident Evil 4. He also voiced Wesker in a fictional documentary titled Wesker's Report, as well as voicing various minor characters throughout the Resident Evil franchise, He played as "Vice-Principal Stern" in My Babysitter's a Vampire in the movie and in the series as the principal antagonist using the Dark Magic with The Lucifractor in the final episode. His distinctive approach to voicing the Wesker character has influenced the performances of subsequent actors in the role, including Jason O'Mara (in the film Resident Evil: Extinction) and D. C. Douglas.

Waugh spent six years with the Shaw Festival and is a multiple award-winner for his work in commercials. On television, he was a member of the repertory cast of the A&E TV series A Nero Wolfe Mystery (2001–2002) and portrayed the character Sappenstein in the 2001 film The Score. In 2010 he played Donald Banse in the pilot episode of the CBS show Blue Bloods. He also played the title role of Jimmy MacDonald in Jimmy MacDonald's Canada, a 2005 comedy mockumentary that ran on CBC. In film, Waugh starred alongside Timothy Dalton in the film Possessed.  He also had a brief appearance in the film Ice Bound: A Woman's Survival at the South Pole. He played Agent Thorn in the 2003 remake of The In-laws.

Filmography

Film

Television

Video games

References

External links

1961 births
20th-century Canadian male actors
21st-century Canadian male actors
Canadian male film actors
Canadian male television actors
Canadian male voice actors
Canadian male video game actors
Living people
Male actors from London, Ontario